Lieutenant General John Henry Ford Elkington  (10 April 1830 – 21 February 1889) was a British Army officer who became Lieutenant Governor of Guernsey.

Military career
Elkington became a lieutenant with the 6th Regiment of Foot in 1849. He served with his Regiment during the 7th and 8th Xhosa Wars. He was appointed Assistant Quartermaster-General to the Ottoman Contingent during the Crimean War and then became Aide-de-Camp to Sir John Michel during the Indian Mutiny. He continued to serve as Aide-de-Camp to Michel during the Second Opium War. In 1880 he became Deputy Adjutant-General for the Auxiliary Forces at Army Headquarters.

He was appointed Lieutenant Governor of Guernsey in 1885 and died in office in 1889. He was also Honorary Colonel of the Fortress and Railway Forces.

His son, John Ford Elkington, was also an officer in the Royal Warwickshire regiment, rising to the rank of lieutenant colonel and command of a battalion.  He was cashiered in 1914 during the First World War and afterwards served in the French Foreign Legion, winning medals for bravery.   In 1916 he was reinstated in his rank in the British Army.

References

1830 births
1889 deaths
British Army lieutenant generals
British Army personnel of the Crimean War
British military personnel of the Indian Rebellion of 1857
British Army personnel of the Second Opium War
Royal Warwickshire Fusiliers officers
Companions of the Order of the Bath
Military personnel from Dublin (city)